The TR series were minesweeping naval trawlers built during World War I. Ordered by the Royal Navy, they were loaned to the Royal Canadian Navy for seaward defence of the East Coast of Canada. The total number of vessels that entered service is unknown with 60 hulls constructed by eight Canadian shipyards. Based on the British , some entered service with the United States Navy during the war. Following World War I, they were sold for commercial use to replace the fishing vessels lost during the war. In World War II many of them were taken over by the Royal Navy as auxiliary minesweepers and two of them returned to the Royal Canadian Navy.

Design and description
The TR series of minesweeping naval trawler were copies of the Royal Navy's . There were some changes in the Canadian version, including the gun being mounted further forward and a different lighting system. The vessels were powered by a steam triple expansion engine driving one shaft creating . A design flaw was later identified where the wireless operator was located in a cabin below the bridge and could not communicate easily with the commander of the vessel. This was rectified with the installation of an interphone.

Service history

Construction and World War I
As late as October 1916, a memorandum created by the Royal Navy argued that naval trawlers were ineffective against the German submarine threat. However, in November, the British Admiralty demanded that Canada expand its East Coast patrol fleet with auxiliary trawlers. The Canadians acquired several fishing trawlers from the United States and converted them into auxiliary minesweeping vessels and ordered the twelve s of their own design from Canadian shipyards. In February 1917, the Admiralty initially ordered the construction of 36 naval trawlers from Canadian shipyards as part of a building programme intended to improve the state of seaward defence in Canadian waters.

The trawlers were constructed at shipyards along the Saint Lawrence River and in the Great Lakes. The crews of the vessels were sent inland from Halifax, Nova Scotia where they had trained. Twenty-two trawlers were constructed and sent to Quebec City to be completed and commissioned before the Saint Lawrence River froze over during the winter at the end of 1917. Once completed and commissioned, the vessels were then sent on to Sydney, Nova Scotia to join the East Coast patrol fleet. However, none of the vessels were completed in time to take part in the 1917 shipping season. This was due to construction delays as the American war effort, which had begun to pick up its pace, began to recruit Canadian workers. This caused work shortages at the Canadian yards. The majority of the trawlers that had arrived at Quebec City were laid up for the winter there, most requiring further work. The ice on the Saint Lawrence River prevented the trawlers from clearing the river until May 1918. In December 1917, the British government sought to expand the shipbuilding contracts in Canada. Alongside a large merchant ship construction programme, the Admiralty ordered a second batch of trawlers from Canadian shipyards. Designated Lot B, they were intended to be delivered by Fall 1918, but a shortage of labour, equipment and material led to delays. The steel required to construct boilers and hulls was delivered as late as August 1918.

Upon arrival, the trawlers were put to use in both minesweeping and patrol roles. In April 1918, four of the trawlers were used for port defence of Halifax and others were used to escort slow convoys through Canadian waters. In order to fill the manpower need for the trawlers, ratings from the Newfoundland division of the Royal Navy Reserve were sent to Canada. By mid-summer 35 of the 36 trawlers were active with the last, TR 20, awaiting her crew at Kingston, Ontario.

In August 1918, the  attacked and sank the tanker Luz Blanca near Halifax. TR 11 and a drifter were the first vessels sent to respond to the sinking. Several other trawlers later joined in on the hunt for the submarine. However, the submarine escaped. Following the attack, the available trawler force was evenly dispersed among the major ports in Nova Scotia of Sydney and Halifax. However, many of the trawlers lacked armament or were defective and the actual numbers of available vessels was much reduced. Later that month, U-156 captured the fishing trawler Triumph and set about sinking vessels of the East Coast fishing fleet, using Triumph to get near their unsuspecting victims. On 21 August, a Canadian patrol unit that included the trawlers TR 22 and TR 32 came upon the U-boat. However, due to signals by one of the senior commanders, the Canadian patrol unit allowed the submarine to escape. The trawlers remained in service until war's end when they were decommissioned and laid up.

Interwar and World War II
TR 37, TR 39, TR 51, TR 55, TR 56, TR 58, TR 59 and TR 60 were all loaned to the United States Navy from November 1918 to August 1919. Following the war, many of the TR series were sold for commercial use in the fishing industry, to make up for losses during the war. 17 were sold to the Boston Deep Sea Fishing and Ice Company. One, TR 4, renamed Cartagena, was resold to the Brazilian Ministry of Marine. However, while being delivered to Rio de Janeiro, the vessel sank in rough weather after last being seen on 15 January 1928. Another, TR 14, renamed , wrecked along the coast of the Isle of Man in 1931.

In World War II, many of these vessels returned to naval service as auxiliary minesweepers in the Royal Navy. Two of them returned to Royal Canadian Navy service as the examination vessels Andrée Dupré and Macsin, in service at Halifax during World War II.

List of vessels

References

Notes

Citations

Sources

External links